Silver Creek is a rural locality in the Whitsunday Region, Queensland, Australia.

Geography
Victoria Creek forms much of the southern boundary before joining Goorganga Creek, which then forms part of the same boundary.

References 

Whitsunday Region
Localities in Queensland